Carlos Luis Suárez Mendoza (born 26 April 1992) is a Venezuelan footballer who plays as a midfielder for Caracas.

International career
Suárez made his senior international debut in a 0–0 draw with Panama. He played 68 minutes before being replaced by Arquímedes Figuera.

Career statistics

Club

Notes

International

References

1992 births
Living people
Venezuelan footballers
Venezuelan expatriate footballers
Venezuela international footballers
Venezuela under-20 international footballers
Association football midfielders
Caracas FC players
Carabobo F.C. players
Monagas S.C. players
Deportivo La Guaira players
Portuguesa F.C. players
Curicó Unido footballers
Chilean Primera División players
Deportes Melipilla footballers
Venezuelan Primera División players
Expatriate footballers in Chile
People from San Felipe, Venezuela
21st-century Venezuelan people